Rami Levy (born 9 March 1958) is an Israeli football manager and a former player for Bnei Yehuda Tel Aviv F.C. He has managed Bnei Yehuda F.C. since 2009.

References

1958 births
Living people
Israeli Jews
Israeli footballers
Bnei Yehuda Tel Aviv F.C. players
Israeli football managers
Bnei Yehuda Tel Aviv F.C. managers
Hapoel Tzafririm Holon F.C. managers
Maccabi Ironi Ashdod F.C. managers
Maccabi Netanya F.C. managers
Hapoel Rishon LeZion F.C. managers
Hapoel Ashkelon F.C. managers
Maccabi Herzliya F.C. managers
Association football midfielders